Argentella is a type of needle lace derived from Argentan lace.

Argentella may also refer to:

Lac de l'Argentella, a reservoir in the Haute-Corse department of Corsica, France
Monte Argentella, a mountain of Marche, Italy